is a railway station in Kurobe, Toyama, Japan, operated by the Kurobe Gorge Railway.

Line
Unazuki Station is served by the Kurobe Gorge Railway Main Line.

Station layout
The station has one island platform with two tracks and side tracks on ground. The platforms are located lower than the station building. There are many parking lots in front of the station.

Adjacent stations
Kurobe Gorge Railway 
main line
train for Kansai Electric Power Company
Unazuki Station - Yanagibashi Station
Passenger Train
Unazuki Station - Kuronagi Station

History
The line opened in 1927 as an industrial railway operated by Nippon Electric Power Company (日本電力). The station opened on 16 November 1953, operated by Kansai Electric Power Company. From 1 July 1971, the station came under the operation of  the Kurobe Gorge Railway.

Surrounding area
It takes about ten minutes between Toyama Chihō Railway Main Line Unazuki Onsen Station and this station.
Unazuki Onsen
Kurobe River Electric Power Museum
Serene Art Museum

Railway stations in Toyama Prefecture